Gaudissart II is a short story by Honoré de Balzac. It was published in 1844 and is one of the Scènes de la vie parisienne of La Comédie humaine.

Plot summary
In this very short story, the owner of a Parisian shop sells a cheap shawl at an inflated price to a wealthy Englishwoman by pretending that it used to be owned by the Empress Joséphine.

Theme
The story is named after a recurring Balzac character, Felix Gaudissart who does not appear in this story. He is a travelling salesman and the main character of L'illustre Gaudissart and also appears in a number of other books of La Comédie humaine. In Gaudissart II, his surname is used as a general term for salesmen, suggesting their similarities. The Parisian salesmen in the story are compared to both the fictitious Felix Gaudissart and the real life politician Talleyrand for their cunning. Talleyrand also briefly appears in Gaudissart II.

References

External links
"Gaudissart II", translation (by Clara Bell and Others) at Project Gutenberg (full text)

1844 short stories
French short stories
Books of La Comédie humaine
Short stories by Honoré de Balzac